Koshkin is a Russian surname, which means "cat" or cat owner", from the Russian word koshka or "cat". An alternative spelling is Koshkyn, and a name with the same meaning is Kotov. The name Koshkin may refer to:

Aleksandr Aleksandrovich Koshkin (born 1941), Russian football player
Aleksandr Koshkyn (1959– 2012), Russian boxer
Dmitriy Koshkin (born 1986), Kazakh skier
Ivan Fyodorovich Koshkin (died 1427), Russian nobleman
Mikhail Koshkin (1898–1940), Russia tank designer
Nikita Koshkin (born 1956), Russian classical guitarist and composer
Zakhary Ivanovich Koshkin (died 1461), Russian nobleman

References

Russian-language surnames